This is a list of Delta Omicron patrons and patronesses.

List of Patrons & Patronesses of Delta Omicron

"*"s indicate deceased patrons or patronesses.

References
National Patrons and Patronesses of Delta Omicron

Patrons
Delta Omicron